The surname Lessa may refer to:

Adriana Lessa
Anderson Lessa, Brazilian footballer
Aureliano Lessa (1828–1861), Brazilian poet, adept of the "Ultra-romanticism" movement
Elsie Lessa (1912–2000), Brazilian journalist and writer of American descent
Fernanda Lessa, Brazilian top model
Ivan Lessa (born 1935), Brazilian journalist and writer of American descent
Leandro Lessa Azevedo (born 1980), Brazilian striker
Orígenes Lessa (1903–1986), journalist, short story writer, novelist, and a writer of essays
William A. Lessa